Ivanovka is a rural locality (a village) in Dobryansky District, Perm Krai, Russia. The population was 38 as of 2010.

References 

Rural localities in Dobryansky District